The Nine Valleys lawsuit (Spanish: Pleito de los nueve Valles) or simply Valleys lawsuit was a process that confronted the Nine Valleys of the Asturias de Santillana (present-day Cantabria, in Spain) with the Dukedom of the Infantado. Begun in 1544 and it was ruled in 1581 in favor of the Nine Valleys. Its importance was capital in the process of the territorial configuration of Cantabria, since he achieved the independence of the valleys, constituted in the province of the Nine Valleys in 1589, germ in turn of the province of Cantabria of 1778, and caused the retreat of the manorial domains in the region. His memorial occupies 178 folios.

It is important to note that the Asturias of Santillana were organized in valleys perpendicular to the sea. That is to say, despite the rise of feudalism, the contemporary society did not have only the village as its nucleus, but there were connections between all the villages in a valley, with a sort of federation of councils. Each valley had its board and ordinances. When the neighbors of those territories litigated against the nobility, they did so therefore through the representation of each valley. The lawsuit was not isolated in time, as other regions of present-day Cantabria tried to shake off the lordly rule, as happened in Liébana.

History

Context 

During the Late Middle Ages the territory that today is Cantabria was divided into merindades, fiscal and legal administrative divisions of the kingdom of Castile controlled by a merino. Their different parcels had different degrees of administration. They could be of realengo (dependent on the king of Castile), of abadengo (of an abbot), solariegas (of a nobleman) and of behetría (of the Crown, but subordinated to a nobleman, freely elected, to whom to pay tribute).

From the 12th century and, mostly, from the 13th century, this territory was dominated by the nobility to the detriment of the power of the abbots, who since the 9th century had held the privileges of the region, especially those of the St. Juliana Abbey. The privileges of the lords continually swelled, obtaining more territories by royal grace or usurpation of territories formerly belonging to the Crown of Castile in terms of taxes, authority and jurisdiction. In turn, the rights of the peasantry, who had originally been able to elect their lords, were diminished. The Asturias de Santillana valleys, before the power of the first Duke of Infantado spread through them, were free to hold general assemblies. The first that was documented happened in 1430 in the Campo del Revolgo of the town of Santillana. The increase of the lordly power is documented by comparison between the Becerro de Behetrías (1351) and the Apeo of 1404, both documents that indicate the conditions of the places. In the first one there are more territories of realengo and behetría and in the second one more of manorialism.

One of the most important lords of the 14th century was Garci Lasso de la Vega I, favourite of Alfonso XI of Castile and chancellor of Valladolid, who was chief of name and of arms of the House de La Vega and obtained territories in the Asturias de Santillana. During the 15th century, the de la Vega family confronted the power of the Crown of Castile, creating the figure of the mayordomazgo to extend their power, an administrative system controlled by them. The Vega family received in 1341, from the hand of Alfonso XI, the valleys of Carriedo, Villaescusa, Cayón, Camargo and Cabezón, along with other properties. Leonor de la Vega, heiress of the lineage, married Diego Hurtado de Mendoza, thus forming the House de la Vega-Mendoza. Their firstborn, Íñigo López de Mendoza, was left at the death of Leonor with the territories of the Asturias de Santillana. In 1445, King John II of Castile confirmed his possessions, a fact that the valleys did not recognize as lawful.

Although the House de la Vega—later united with the house of Mendoza—was the most powerful, other noble families disputed the territories, even in some of the nine valleys. This is the case of the counts of Castañeda, who took possession by force of some areas of the valley of Camargo.

It must be said that at the beginning of the 16th century, in the territories controlled by the Duke of Infantado, and especially the Asturias de Santillana, the peasantry suffered a continuous increase in taxes, which stirred up discontent. Independence from manorial rule was desirable, since taxes could remain in symbolic amounts. This situation occurred in Trasmiera, the valleys of Soba and Ruesga, and in that of Carriedo since the Duke of Infantado lost power after the sentence of 1505. In addition, some of these communities did not have to pay tariffes for importing basic necessities. However, after the lawsuit was won and the nine valleys returned to the royal manor status, the fiscal pressure intensified even more.

The first lawsuits 
It is often considered that the Valleys lawsuit lasted from 1438 until its resolution in 1581 or even until the creation of the province of the Nine Valleys in 1589; that is, about 150 years. In reality it was a series of lawsuits, the first of which was the "Old Valleys Lawsuit", which favored the manorial power.

The Old Valleys Lawsuit (1438-1444) 
At the beginning of the 12th century, the peasantry of the Merindad of the Asturias de Santillana, fed up with their situation, rose up in various lawsuits against the De la Vega-Mendoza. The Old Valleys Lawsuit began in 1438 because the valleys disputed their belonging to the manorialism of Íñigo López de Mendoza, arguing that during the last decades they had allowed to remain under the rule of the house de la Vega only because they thought the king had not heard their complaints, being the holder a friend of theirs. During the mandate of Leonor de la Vega, the tact of the latter, a "true lady", had prevented the complaints from erupting. However, Íñigo entered the valleys with great violence, taking possession of them by force of arms, which provoked the anger and rebellion of the peasants.

In 1444, the first lawsuit was ruled by the corregidor of the Asturias de Oviedo in favor of Íñigo López de Mendoza, who soon after obtained the titles of marquis of Santillana and count of Real de Manzanares. This fact meant the delivery of Santillana del Mar to the Marquis of Santillana, and therefore the end of its merindad and its general boards, since the jurisdiction of the Asturias de Santillana became a privilege of the De la Vega-Mendoza houses, which was confirmed by Juan II in 1448.

This marquisate included the valleys of Carriedo—later split after its lawsuit—, Cayón, Penagos, Villaescusa, Piélagos, Camargo, Reocín, Cabezón, Cabuérniga, Alfoz de Lloredo—all of them split after the Nine Valleys lawsuit—, Anieva, Cieza and Lamasón, as well as the town of Santillana, the domains grouped under the name Tierra de la Vega (English: "Land of de La Vega"), and Pando (now Torrelavega). In 1475 the marquis of Santillana also received the dukedom of the Infantado.

The Carriedo lawsuit (1495-1499) 
Leonor de la Vega, in her will, had bequeathed the valley of Carriedo to Íñigo López de Mendoza, despite the fact that this valley did not belong to her since in 1403 a conflict regarding its possession had been settled with the corregidor of the Hermandad de las Cuatro Villas de la Costa. However, in 1495 the peasantry of the said valley wanted to emancipate themselves, presenting their request before the monarchy in what is known as the Carriedo lawsuit. Carriedo, located southeast of the Asturias de Santillana, then belonged to the Velasco family and was coveted by the Mendozas; the peasants were reluctant to fall in front of the lords, who used violence to make them desist from their efforts. The lawsuit was ruled by the chancillería de Valladolid in 1499 in favor of the valley, which thus achieved its jurisdictional independence. The sentence was appealed and again confirmed in 1504, 1505 y 1546.

In the Carriedo lawsuit, the valley declared that it had not denounced its lordly situation during the reigns of John II and Enrique IV of Castile "because there was always favour and wars and fears". Like Carriedo, the other prosecuted valleys of the Asturias de Santillana later claimed that they too had never considered manorial domination legitimate.

The Nine Valleys lawsuit 

After the ruling of the Carriedo lawsuit, they decided to appeal to the monarchy the valleys of Alfoz de Lloredo, Cabezón, Cabuérniga, Camargo, Cayón, Penagos, Piélagos, Reocín and Villaescusa, part of the Asturias de Santillana, which belonged to the dukes of Infantado, also marquises of Santillana. The valleys presented their querencia in 1544 to the Duke of Infantado. Reocín and Cabuérniga were late possessions of the Duke, and Cabuérniga joined the lawsuit later, so they are sometimes not presented as complainantss. The valleys protested before the king saying that:

Sentence of 1553 
The first sentence (in degree of view), of October 17, 1553, was positive for the valleys, who achieved advances in matters of taxes and rents for the dukes, as well as considering the civil and criminal jurisdiction of their territory as royal right, returning it to the royal manor. This conclusion came when it was considered that the Mendozas had forced their power over the valleys, saying that they had obtained the favour of:

This sentence did not grant validity to the documents presented by Íñigo López de Mendoza regarding his inheritance. The prosecutor Juan García even considered perjury more than fifty witnesses who testified in favor of the duke, who filed as many as four allegations.

Sentencia de 1568 
La sentencia fue recurrida por los duques, pero en 1568 se confirmó la sentencia anterior.

Sentence of 1578 
In 1578, the Chancellery of Valladolid confirmed the return of civil and criminal jurisdiction to the mayors of the valleys. The valleys of Reocín and Cabuérniga—which had not been part of the manorialism until 1544—were included.

Sentence of 1581 
In 1581, the royal manor status of the valleys was confirmed for the last time and the construction of a province including them was fixed.

Province of the Nine Valleys 
The direct consequences of the resolution of the conflict were the return of the valleys to the Castilian crown, integrated in 1589 the "Province of the Nine Valleys of the Asturias de Santillana", the recovery of the royal power and the reduction of the manorial power in the area. The new province was constituted in the Casa de juntas de Puente San Miguel, where in 1778 it was decided to integrate it into another province—province of Cantabria—which although short-lived is considered the political and historical origin of the current autonomous community.

The province of the Nine Valleys obtained privileges, among other monarchs, from Philip IV (1630), who allowed it to be governed by "ordinary mayors". This fact is the reason why 1630 is oftentimes considered the date for the creation of the province. Other times, the assumed date is 1581, the year in which the lawsuit ended. In 1645, the general ordinances of the province came into force, which were reformed in 1757.

Arguments

Of the valleys 
The Nine Valleys wanted to join the Carriedo lawsuit as a precedent and concentrated their arguments on the following points:

 Justice. The dukes did not allow them to adopt mayors, merinos or other judicial positions, which forced them to always receive justice from the town of Santillana del Mar, controlled by the dukes themselves.
 Security. The roads between the towns were not protected, which meant that travelers who had to go to Santillana were easily assaulted and even killed many times. The insecurity was increased by taking advantage of the lawsuits, so that those who had to go to Santillana died on the roads.
 Economy. The dukes forced the peasants to pay tribute to pay for the administration of justice, which they complained about. They also imprisoned the rebellious council procurators.
 Corruption. The dukes paid the scribes to have them at their disposal. In addition, the soldiers, to the orders of the dukes, taking advantage of the tension generated by the lawsuits, did not punish the violence, not even the murder, which caused the murder rate to increase.

Of the dukes 

 Rights. The Dukes of Infantado argued that the territories had belonged to the house of de la Vega for 100 years. They also claimed that in 1420, John II of Castile had given Leonor de la Vega confirmation of possession over the valleys, even though this was not exercised until 1448, when it was done by means of force.

Reactions

Royalty 
The royalty was happy to regain power in the north of the Iberian Peninsula, successively lost for three centuries. In addition to the creation of the province of the Nine Valleys, to which different kings were adding ordinances, the valley of Carriedo, antecedent of the Valleys lawsuit, received from the king the title of "Royal Valley of Carriedo."

Dukes of the Infantado 
The response of the dukes was very violent. There are several testimonies about the atrocities committed by order of Íñigo López de Mendoza, his friends and followers before and during the years that the lawsuits lasted. Juan Martínez, witness in the lawsuit, assured that the duke had entered his valley surrounded by men with banners, atabals and trumpets and had made it surrender by force, making people and cattle flee to the mountains. Afterwards, he burned the houses and imposed punishments on those he could find. Pero Díaz and Juan de Matamorosa, opponents of the duke, had their houses burned and were thrown out of windows. Don Íñigo even mistreated hidalgo opponents related to the house de La Vega, and imprisoned one of them for eight months. When the Infantado finally lost the lawsuit of 1581, the contemporary duke decided to focus his attention on the last territories that were granted to him in other parts of the peninsula.

Memorial 
The name of the document of the lawsuit, printed in 1566, is Memorial contra las escrituras que el fiscal y valles presentan por autos de jurisdicción (English: "Memorial against the deeds filed by the prosecutor and valleys for writs of jurisdiction"). In it are contained documents of previous lawsuits against the same noble family, being one, for example, from 1398, prior to the "Old lawsuit"; another of the attached documents dates from 1351. In 1910, the Jurisdiction of Cantabria published it under the title Memorial presentado al Rey por el Duque del Infantado en el pleito sostenido contra el Fiscal y los 7 valles de Villaescusa, Cayón, Penagos, Camargo, Cabezón, Alfoz de Lloredo y Piélagos. (English: "Memorial presented to the King by the Duke of Infantado in the lawsuit against the Prosecutor and the 7 valleys of Villaescusa, Cayón, Penagos, Camargo, Cabezón, Alfoz de Lloredo and Piélagos").

The documentation of the lawsuit, lost, was recovered on February 8, 1957, when the journalist and writer Antonio Bartolomé Suárez discovered the original documents in a house in Reocín, where a family was preserving them. Manuel Bartolomé García, Antonio's son, was appointed in 2016 Escribano de la Merindad de las Asturias de Santillana, in recognition of his literary career and collaboration to the history of the Nine Valleys; appointment supported by all the representatives of the Nine Valleys in the Casa de Juntas of Puente San Miguel on the Institutions Day

The memorial as a whole has numerous additions and documents that give a good sample of the state of La Marina since the beginning of the 14th century, among them the Apeo de Pero Alfonso de Escalante.

Manorial places of the valleys 

The memorial of the lawsuit has been studied in reference to the history of Cantabria for including a list of the towers and fortresses that contained the eight valleys (not including Carriedo). In total there are 43 towers and 2 fortresses, in addition to the Castle of Pedraja, quite a number of fortifications for such a small territory. It is believed that in the 16th century there were in the whole of Asturias de Santillana more than 200 towers and fortresses along with more than 1000 hidalgo plots, as mentioned in the memorial. The following table shows the contribution of Fernando José de Velasco y Ceballos, who associated some of the towers cited to possible lineages.

See also 

 Cantabria
 Defensive towers of Cantabria
 Asturias de Santillana

References

Additional bibliography 

 
 
 

Cantabrian nobility
Castile and León
History of Cantabria